Senafe ,  is a market town in southern Eritrea, on the edge of the Eritrean highlands ሶይራ. The surrounding area is inhabited by the Saho people and the Tigrinya people, its well known by its cultural and religious historical background. some of these historical places includes KASKASE,ABUNE ANBES and BELEW-KELEW. 

Senafe is known for the ruins of Metera (also known as Balaw Kalaw), Qohayto to the south, and for Kaskase to the north. The soil is derived from volcanic ignimbrite, and Senafe sits on the southeastern edge of a twenty kilometer wide caldera.

History
The original name for Saanafè was "Hakir", a Saho word. Local tradition states that the name was changed by a man named Abdullah from Sana'a in Yemen; he settled in the Awdie district of Hakir, and upon marrying a local woman he was quoted as saying "Sana-fen" which means in Arabic "where is Sana'a" he was relating to his hometown; thus the town was named Sanafe; his descendants form a tribe and are also known as Saanafè.

An early record of Sanafe is on the Egyptus Novello map, published in 1454. This map shows Sanafe at the Southern part of Eritrea. 

Due to war (1998-2000) between Eritrea and Ethiopia, Senafe's economy was damaged badly. The highest mountain located in the Senafe municipality is Soira. Other high mountains that surrounded Senafe include: Metera,Emba Saum,Emba-tarika and Emba Derho.

 

During Italian rule, the town grew notably: The modern town suffered extensive destruction during the Eritrean War of Independence and the war between Eritrea and Ethiopia.

Climate
The prevailing climate in Senafe is known as a steppe climate.

Notes and references

Southern Region (Eritrea)
Populated places in Eritrea